

Definitions 
Sexual opportunism is the selfish pursuit of sexual opportunities for one's own sake when they arise, often with the negative moral connotation that it, in some way it "takes advantage" of others, or "makes use" of, or "exploits", other persons for sexual purposes. Sexual opportunism is sometimes also defined as the use of sexual favours for selfish purposes unrelated to the sexual activity, in which case taking a sexual opportunity is merely the means to achieve a quite different purpose, for example, to advance one's career or obtain status or money.

This concept can be connected to Quid Pro Quo sexual harassment, which is defined by Cornell Law School as "Sexual harassment in which a boss conveys to an employee that he or she will base an employment decision, e.g. whether to hire, promote, or fire that employee, on the employee's satisfaction of sexual demand. For example, it is quid pro quo sexual harassment for a boss to offer a raise in exchange for sex."

Study of women's fertile-phase sexuality found out that compare to luteal phase, fertile women may shows more interest on sexual opportunism, specifically means that that may willing to engage in and interest in sex with attractive men, even they do not know each other well.

Controversy 
Sexual opportunism is a disputed concept, because: 
moral norms for the legitimate pursuit of sexual desire are often not agreed upon, or influenced by different religious, cultural or spiritual beliefs.  The range of sexual behaviors tolerated or not tolerated can vary greatly across time and place. In some cultures, for example, there are very strong social sanctions against "sex purely for the sake of sex", in other cultures this is regarded more as a private or personal matter, unless it involves unlawful activity. Inversely, the use of sex for a purpose or function unrelated to the sexual activity itself may be tolerated in one context or place, and proscribed in another (see also prostitution and sex tourism).
a discrepancy between motives considered appropriate, and purely selfish or self-serving motives, may be very difficult to establish, even for the people involved, particularly if an allegedly "opportunist" sexual advance is validated by its acceptance by a potential sexual partner, who responds positively to the opportunity out of the personal free will. Thus the exact boundary between "seizing a sexual opportunity" and "sexual opportunism" may be difficult to distinguish. Often sexual seduction involves precisely the "disguise" of sexual motive, and an attempt to persuade a potential sexual partner that more, or other (honourable) motives are involved than just sex, which may or may not be true—without this being easily verifiable—even for the persons involved themselves. The complicating factor is that the motivations or intentions involved in a sexual attraction may not be clear even to those who are party to it.

In a clinical or scientific sense, sexual opportunism is often straightforwardly described as observable sexual promiscuity or the observable propensity to engage in casual sex,  whatever the motive. Such an "objective" description is used, because:
 it may not clear or provable that such behaviour conflicts with relevant principles (unless it demonstrably involves unlawful behavior).
what matters for medical, juridical or scientific purposes is primarily that it occurs, irrespective of what the motives are, or how those motives are morally judged by the people involved or by others.
because the judgment that the motives involved are "selfish" or signify "irresponsibility" depends on one's point of view and cannot, or not easily, be objectively or scientifically established.

Related events 
There have been public and mainstream scandals that have revolved around the concept of Sexual opportunism. In 2022, the game developing company Activision was involved in a scandal where an ex-employed exposed the company for creating a "open ‘frat boy’ environment fostered rampant sexism, harassment and discrimination".

See also 
 Opportunism
 Sexual harassment
 Sex tourism

References

Sexuality and society
Opportunism